Hirofumi Takinami is a Japanese politician who is a member of the House of Councillors of Japan.

Biography 
He had attended The University of Tokyo, graduating in 1971, from The University of Chicago in 1998, and Wasdea University in 2021.
He had taught at Stanford University from 2009 to 2011.

References 

Living people
1971 births
Members of the House of Councillors (Japan)
University of Chicago alumni
Waseda University alumni
University of Tokyo alumni